The Saint Nicholas Serbian Orthodox Cathedral is a Serbian Orthodox cathedral located at 149 Nash Road South, Hamilton, Ontario, Canada. It is dedicated to Saint Nicholas. Nearby, on Barton street there is another house of worship also named after St. Nicholas the Wonderworker, the oldest Serbian church in Eastern Canada: St. Nikola Serbian Orthodox Church (built in 1917).

See also
Saint Petka Serbian Orthodox Church
Serbian Orthodox Eparchy of Canada
Holy Transfiguration Monastery
Holy Trinity Serbian Orthodox Church (Montreal)
Saint Sava Serbian Orthodox Church (Toronto)
Saint Arsenije Sremac Serbian Orthodox Church
All Serbian Saints Serbian Orthodox Church (Mississauga)
Holy Trinity Serbian Orthodox Church (Regina)
Saint Michael the Archangel Serbian Orthodox Church (Toronto)
St. Stefan Serbian Orthodox Church (Ottawa)
Serbian Canadians

References

External links
 

Churches in Hamilton, Ontario
Serbian Orthodox cathedrals
Serbian Orthodox church buildings in Canada
Eastern Orthodox church buildings in Canada
Church buildings with domes
Serbian-Canadian culture